The term "CD85" was originally used to refer to LILR1 which is now known as CD85j; however, there are a number of CD85 genes:

LILR: leukocyte immunoglobulin-like receptor; ILT: immunoglobulin-like transcript; LIR: leukocyte inhibitory receptor; MIR: macrophage inhibitory receptor.

References

Receptors